The House at 1513 8th in Las Vegas, New Mexico was listed on the National Register of Historic Places in 1985.

It was built as part of the "Eighth Street Extension".

References

National Register of Historic Places in San Miguel County, New Mexico